Cambria is an unincorporated community in Owen Township, Clinton County, Indiana.

History
Cambria was established as a station on the Monon Railroad which was built through the southwestern portion of Owen Township. Cambria is the classical name for Wales. A post office was established at Cambria in 1883, and remained in operation until it was discontinued in 1915.

Geography

References

Unincorporated communities in Clinton County, Indiana
Unincorporated communities in Indiana